The open central unrounded vowel, or low central unrounded vowel, is a type of vowel sound, used in many spoken languages. While the International Phonetic Alphabet officially has no dedicated letter for this sound between front  and back , it is normally written . If precision is required, it can be specified by using diacritics, typically centralized .

It is usual to use plain  for an open central vowel and, if needed,  for an open front vowel. Sinologists may use the letter  (small capital A). The IPA has voted against officially adopting this symbol in 1976, 1989, and 2012.

The Hamont-Achel dialect of Limburgish has been reported to contrast long open front, central and back unrounded vowels. This is extremely unusual.

Features

 This often subsumes open (low) front vowels, because the tongue does not have as much flexibility in positioning as it does for the close (high) vowels; the difference between an open front vowel and an open back vowel is equal to the difference between a close front and a close central vowel, or a close central and a close back vowel.

Occurrence
Most languages have some form of an unrounded open vowel. Because the IPA uses  for both front and central unrounded open vowels, it is not always clear whether a particular language uses the former or the latter. However, there may not actually be a difference. (See Vowel#Acoustics.)

Notes

References

External links
 
 
 

Open vowels
Central vowels
Unrounded vowels